The Vaughn House is a historic house at 104 Rosetta Street in Little Rock, Arkansas.  It is a -story wood-frame structure, with a gabled roof and an exterior of clapboard and stuccoed half-timbering.  The roof eave is lined with large Craftsman brackets, and the roof extends over the front porch, showing rafter ends, and supported by stone piers.  Built in 1914, it is a well-preserved local example of Craftsman architecture.

The house was listed on the National Register of Historic Places in 1999.

See also
National Register of Historic Places listings in Little Rock, Arkansas

References

Houses on the National Register of Historic Places in Arkansas
Houses completed in 1914
Houses in Little Rock, Arkansas
National Register of Historic Places in Little Rock, Arkansas
Historic district contributing properties in Arkansas
1914 establishments in Arkansas